Maigret voit rouge (English: Maigret Sees Red) is a 1963 French-Italian crime film directed by Gilles Grangier and starring Jean Gabin, Françoise Fabian and Roland Armontel. Based on the 1951 novel Maigret, Lognon and the Gangsters by Georges Simenon, it is Gabin's third appearance as Belgian writer Georges Simenon's fictional detective Jules Maigret.

It was shot at the Billancourt Studios in Paris and on location across the city. The film's sets were designed by the art director Jacques Colombier.

Synopsis
A man is run down and injured by a car near the Gare du Nord. However, by the time the police arrive on the scene the victim has disappeared.

Cast
 Jean Gabin as Jules Maigret
 Françoise Fabian as Lily 
 Roland Armontel as Le docteur Fezin 
 Paul Frankeur as Bonfils
 Paul Carpenter as Harry McDonald
 Edward Meeks as Bill Larner
 Ricky Cooper as Charlie
 Michel Constantin as Cicero
 Roger Dutoit as Bidoine
 Carlo Nell as Le garçon du 'Manhattan'
 Charles Bouillaud as Le pharmacien Dullac
 André Dalibert as Un inspecteur
 Harry-Max as Curtis
 Jean-Louis Le Goff as Un inspecteur
 Paulette Dubost as La patronne de l'hôtel
 Laurence Badie as Lucienne
 Jacques Dynam as Un inspecteur
 Marcel Bozzuffi as Torrence
 Guy Decomble as Lognon
 Vittorio Sanipoli as Pozzo

References

External links

1963 crime films
1963 films
French crime films
1960s French-language films
Maigret films
Films set in Paris
Films shot in Paris
Films shot at Billancourt Studios
Italian crime films
Police detective films
1960s police procedural films
Films directed by Gilles Grangier
Titanus films
1960s French films
1960s Italian films